Banco Hipotecario (BCBA:BHIP) is a commercial bank and mortgage lender in Argentina.

Overview

The institution was chartered on September 24, 1886, as the Banco Hipotecario Nacional (National Mortgage Bank) by a bill (Law 1804) signed by President Julio Roca. The bank pioneered mortgage lending on extended, low-interest terms in Argentina, and thus contributed to consolidating a modern Argentine economy (a policy centerpiece of the Generation of '80, as Roca and his allies were known).

The bank continued to grow and, during the administration of President Hipólito Yrigoyen (1916–22), its share of the nation's mortgages doubled to 37%. The headquarters relocated in 1942 from its original, Baroque headquarters in the financial district (transferred to the Central Bank of Argentina) to a larger, Rationalist office building facing Plaza de Mayo. The bank again grew significantly during President Juan Perón's populist administration, boosting its loan portfolio from 100,000 mortgages in 1946 to 500,000 a decade later.

During the Perón years, the bank began advancing home ownership by promoting direct lending to builders, and by allowing an accelerated amortization of its loans, whereby borrowers' 4% mortgages were mitigated further by inflation, which averaged 26% from 1944 to 1974; as two-thirds of the institution's loans at the time were on a 15- or 20-year basis, this became an important subsidy for local borrowers, extending home ownership to a majority of households.

The bank's core business was adversely affected by policy changes during the dictatorship installed in 1976. Central Bank Circular 1050, enacted in April 1980 at the behest of conservative Economy Minister José Alfredo Martínez de Hoz, bankrupted thousands of homeowners by indexing mortgages to the value of the US dollar locally, which rose around fifteenfold by July 1982, when Central Bank President Domingo Cavallo rescinded the policy.

During the resulting stagflation of the 1980s, the Mortgage Bank increasingly became the prime source of not only mortgages, but of construction financing, as well, and directly funded the completion of over 15,000 homes a year (roughly half the average annual rate of private sector housing starts during that difficult decade). This practice, however, required growing subsidies from the Central Bank (over US$400 million annually), and during the era of financial liberalization advanced by President Carlos Menem from 1989 onwards, this support was reduced. The National Mortgage Bank became a secondary player in the small, domestic mortgage market. Ultimately, the bank, which remained smaller, commercial and profitable up to that date, was privatized in 1997.

The IPO failed to attract the expected investor interest, and the state retained around 40% of the entity. Its leading private shareholder, real estate development firm IRSA, would control 25-30%, and though its interest in increasing its stake grew with the recovery in the Argentine economy after 2002, President Néstor Kirchner maintained the bank's significant government ownership. The headquarters was subsequently relocated to Clorindo Testa's Banco de Londres y América del Sur building, one of the country's best-known works of Brutalist architecture.

Though no longer the main source of mortgage lending in Argentina, the bank continues to account for around a fourth of the total. It was the thirteenth largest among all banks in Argentina by assets (US$2.8 billion) and lending portfolio (US$1.6 billion) in 2011, and maintains 52 branches employing nearly 1,900 staff. The bank was commissioned in June 2012 to administer the PRO.CRE.AR initiative, a home loan program funded by the ANSES social insurance agency to make over us$4 billion available over four years for the construction of 100,000 new homes for private ownership and at relatively low interest rates and long terms (4 to 16%, with initial rates 2% below these, and 20 to 30 years, in each case depending on income); over 1.4 million prospective borrowers submitted on-line questionnaires in the program's first week alone.

Selected branches

References

External links

 Official website

Companies listed on the Buenos Aires Stock Exchange
Banks of Argentina
Banks established in 1886
1886 establishments in Argentina